Baseball's Seasons is an American television documentary series that was aired on MLB Network from January 7, 2009 until December 30, 2013. Each episode takes a look at a season in the history of Major League Baseball. The series is narrated by Curt Chaplin. Like a lot of the network's other original programming, Baseball's Seasons airs when the league is in offseason.

The series is currently available for streaming online on  the streaming services Apple TV+ and Pluto TV.

Episodes

References

External links
 

2009 American television series debuts
2013 American television series endings
2000s American documentary television series
2010s American documentary television series
MLB Network original programming
English-language television shows
Documentary films about baseball